Royce Pollard (born 1939) is an American politician who served as the six-term mayor of Vancouver, Washington. He served seven years on City Council and became mayor in 1996. He lost a reelection race to Tim Leavitt in 2010.

Early history
A native of Burlington, Vermont, Pollard served in the U.S. Army beginning in 1961, including deployment during the Vietnam War; he is a member of the American Legion and the Vietnam Veterans of America. His final post was as Commander of the Vancouver Barracks, from which he retired in 1988 as a lieutenant colonel. Subsequently, the Pollard family settled in Vancouver and he was elected to the City Council a year later in 1989. Pollard is married, and has two sons.

As mayor
After serving for seven years on the City Council, Pollard was elected mayor in January 1996. He then served consecutive terms as mayor until 2010. Cumulatively, he held public office in the city for around 20 years, shaping much of its development in the late 20th and early 21st centuries. His most notable exploits have been a major revival of Vancouver's once-dilapidated downtown core, shepherding the city's growth by 100,000 residents, and championing a controversial project to replace the Interstate Bridge and expand the MAX Light Rail system into Clark County. In addition to mass transit, Pollard has long supported green modes of transportation such as walking and biking.

Pollard was a promoter of the moniker of "America's Vancouver" for the city, in order to differentiate it from the larger but younger city of Vancouver, British Columbia. The mayor was also  a staunch defender of Vancouver's independence from nearby Portland, Oregon. In a highly publicized gesture in 2005, he purchased and destroyed coffee mugs with Portland logos at Vancouver Starbucks after the company failed to remove them from stores.

Post-mayoral life
Pollard was named First Citizen of Clark County.

See also
 List of mayors of Vancouver, Washington

Footnotes

References
 
 
 

1939 births
Living people
Mayors of Vancouver, Washington
American military personnel of the Vietnam War
Politicians from Burlington, Vermont
Military personnel from Vermont
United States Army officers
Washington (state) city council members